Rupert Staudinger (born 15 July 1997) is a British-German luger. Born in Berchtesgaden in Bavaria to a German father and a Welsh mother, he grew up in Schönau am Königssee.

Staudinger competed for the United Kingdom in the men's singles event at the 2018 Winter Olympics. Since no British athlete qualified for the 2014 Winter Olympics, luge did not receive UK Sport funding for the 2018 Olympic cycle. Staudinger still qualified for the 2018 Winter Olympics and finished in 33rd place despite posting his best time.

References

External links
 

1997 births
Living people
British male lugers
Olympic lugers of Great Britain
Lugers at the 2018 Winter Olympics
Lugers at the 2022 Winter Olympics
People from Berchtesgaden
Sportspeople from Upper Bavaria
German people of Welsh descent